Édouard Dapples (12 December 1807, in Lausanne – 30 April 1887, in Nice) was a Swiss politician, syndic of Lausanne from 1843 to 1848 and from 1857 to 1867, member of the Swiss National Council from 1851 to 1854 and from 1857 to 1866, he presided this assembly in 1861. Avenue Édouard Dapples in Lausanne is named after him.

References

1807 births
1887 deaths
People from Lausanne
Swiss Calvinist and Reformed Christians
Members of the National Council (Switzerland)
Presidents of the National Council (Switzerland)
Mayors of Lausanne